Brandon Diego Paiber (born 5 June 1995) is a professional footballer who plays as a midfielder for Valletta. Born in Argentina, he represents the Malta national team.

Club career
Paiber joined Floriana in January 2019 on loan from St. Lucia, before joining on a permanent basis for the 2019–20 season.

International career
Paiber made his international debut for Malta on 15 November 2019 in a UEFA Euro 2020 qualifying match against Spain, which finished as a 0–7 away loss.

Personal life
Paiber was born in Argentina, and is the son of the former professional footballer Cesar Paiber. Paiber spent his youth in Malta when his father played there, and has a Maltese passport.

Career statistics

International

References

External links
 
 
 

1995 births
Living people
Sportspeople from Buenos Aires Province
People with acquired Maltese citizenship
Maltese footballers
Malta international footballers
Argentine footballers
Argentine emigrants to Malta
Association football midfielders
Club Atlético Fénix players
Ħamrun Spartans F.C. players
Club Comunicaciones footballers
St. Lucia F.C. players
Floriana F.C. players
Primera B Metropolitana players
Maltese Premier League players